Pablo Cesar Barrientos (born 17 January 1985) is an Argentine former professional footballer who played as an attacking midfielder.

Club career

San Lorenzo
Barrientos was born in Comodoro Rivadavia, Argentina. He began his professional career in 2003 with San Lorenzo, as he officially was promoted from youth team football to the club's first team. He established himself at the Argentine club, and his performance saw him begin to earn call-ups to the Argentine U20 and U21 football teams. At the age of 21, he had made 72 league appearances with 7 league goals, also earning 15 caps and scoring 6 goals for his country. His form lead to many transfer rumours, and the player was linked to a host of European clubs. However, in July 2006, Barrientos transferred to FC Moscow, of Russia.

FC Moscow
Following his move to Russia, Barrientos did not hold down a guaranteed starting spot and after two seasons in the Russian Premier League, he had made 33 league appearances and scored 6 goals. For the 2008–09 season, Barrientos was sent back on loan to San Lorenzo. He scored 9 goals in 21 league starts. Following his return to Moscow, he was again linked to several different clubs. In May 2009, it was confirmed that Barrientos signed for Sicilian club Calcio Catania in the Serie A.

Calcio Catania
On 30 May 2009, Calcio Catania officially signed Barrientos from FC Moscow on a four-year contract until June 2013. He was plagued by injury and failed to make his debut for the Sicilian club until May 2010. After making two substitute appearances for Catania in the whole of the 2009–10 season, Barrientos did not play any matches in the first half of the 2010–11 Serie A season. Therefore, he was loaned to Estudiantes back in Argentina for six months. After the loan spell during which he scored five goals in seven league matches, Barrientos returned to Catania in July 2011 and became a key component to the team under new head coach, Vincenzo Montella. During the 2012-13 Serie A campaign, Barrientos was a key part of Rolando Maran's first team, scoring 5 goals in 27 league appearances. He formed part of an all-Argentine attack force with Gonzalo Bergessio, Alejandro Gómez, and Lucas Castro for the Sicilian club that has seen i rossazzurri push for the European places.

Barrientos was part of a record-breaking Catania outfit that had picked up 56 points from 38 Serie A matches. This performance saw the club also break its record number of home victories in a single season, its record number of victories overall in a single top flight campaign, as well as its record points total in Serie A for the fifth consecutive season.

San Lorenzo
In July 2014 it was reported that Barrientos would return to San Lorenzo, the team in which he made his debut as a professional player. It was his third time playing for El Ciclón.

Toluca
On 29 July 2016, Barrientos signed for Deportivo Toluca.

Later career and retirement
In February 2020, after a spell with Nacional, Barrientos announced his retirement from professional football. 

In October 2020, however, he returned to his former youth club Jorge Newbery de Comodoro Rivadavia back in his hometown Comodoro Rivadavia. After a third degree sprain in January 2021, Barrientos announced that he would retire completely from playing football. A week later, the vice president of the club and brother of Pablo Barrientos, Leo Barrientos, confirmed that Pablo would be a part of the club's management.

International career
After receiving 15 U-20 caps for his country in which he scored 6 goals, Barrientos received a call-up to the Argentina squad against Chile on 15 November 2008 by Alfio Basile.

Personal life
Pablo's brother, Hugo is a fellow footballer playing in Argentina.

Career statistics

Honours
San Lorenzo
Copa Libertadores: 2014
Supercopa Argentina: 2015

References

External links
 Argentine Primera statistics at Fútbol XXI  

1985 births
Living people
People from Comodoro Rivadavia
Argentine footballers
Association football midfielders
Argentina under-20 international footballers
Argentine Primera División players
Russian Premier League players
Liga MX players
Serie A players
Uruguayan Primera División players
Club Atlético Huracán footballers
San Lorenzo de Almagro footballers
Estudiantes de La Plata footballers
FC Moscow players
Catania S.S.D. players
Deportivo Toluca F.C. players
Club Nacional de Football players
Argentine expatriate footballers
Argentine expatriate sportspeople in Russia
Expatriate footballers in Russia
Argentine expatriate sportspeople in Italy
Expatriate footballers in Italy
Argentine expatriate sportspeople in Mexico
Expatriate footballers in Mexico
Argentine expatriate sportspeople in Uruguay
Expatriate footballers in Uruguay